Tumandar is a title given to the leader of Baloch and Pashtoon tribe in Pakistan. 

As defined in the Gazette of Pakistan, a "Tumandar" or "Sardar" who is accepted as the leader of a tribe, under any custom or usage or otherwise could obtain free labour from other persons or compel them to work against their will.

Cases 
 Nawab Akbar Shahbaz Khan Bugti (July 12, 1927–August 26, 2006) was the Tumandar (head) of the Bugti tribe.
 In Rajanpur, Sardar Balakh Sher Mazari is the Tumandar and the Paramount Sardar of the Mazari tribe.
In Rahim Yar Khan, Sardar M Iftikhar Khan Korai is the Tumandar (head or Chief) of the Korai Blouch tribe. 
Zhob Tumandar belongs to Nawab Jogezai family.
Loralai Tumandar belongs to Sardar Luni family.
Kohlu Tumandar belongs to Nawab Marri family.
Jhal Magsi Tumandar belongs to Nawab Magsi family.
Sibi Tumandar belongs to Nawab Barozai family.

References 

 
Titles in Pakistan
Baloch culture
Titles of national or ethnic leadership